William Lyndwood (c. 1375 – 21/22 October 1446) was an English bishop of St. David's, diplomat and canonist, most notable for the publication of the Provinciale.

Early life
Lyndwood was born in Linwood, Lincolnshire, one of seven children. His parents were John Lyndwood (died 1419), a prosperous wool merchant, and his wife Alice. There is a monumental brass to John Lyndwood in the local parish church in which an infant William is portrayed decked in the robes of a doctor of laws.

Lyndwood was educated at Gonville Hall, Cambridge though few details are known. He is thought to have become a fellow of Pembroke College, Cambridge though later he moved to Oxford where he became DCL "probably rather by incorporation than constant education". He took Holy Orders and was ordained deacon in 1404 and priest in 1407.

Career
Lyndwood had a distinguished ecclesiastical career. In 1408, Robert Hallum, Bishop of Salisbury appointed Lyndwood to his consistory court. Then, in 1414, Lyndwood was appointed "Official" of the Archbishop of Canterbury (i.e. his principal adviser and representative in matters of ecclesiastical law) in 1414, and Dean of the Arches in 1426, while holding at the same time several important benefices and prebends. In 1433 he was collated 1434 Archdeacon of Stow in the Diocese of Lincoln, and in 1442, after an earnest recommendation from King Henry VI, he was promoted by Pope Eugene IV to the vacant See of St. David's. During these years Lyndwood's attention was occupied by many other matters besides the study of canon law. He had been closely associated with Archbishop Henry Chichele in his proceedings against the Lollards. He had also acted several times as the chosen representative of the English clergy in their discussions with the Crown over subsidies, but more especially he had repeatedly been sent abroad on diplomatic missions, for example to Portugal, France and the Netherlands, besides acting as the King's Proctor at the Council of Basle in 1433 and taking a prominent part as negotiator in arranging political and commercial treaties.

He was also Keeper of the Privy Seal from 1432 to 1443. Despite the fact that so much of Lyndwood's energies were spent upon purely secular concerns nothing seems ever to have been said against his moral or religious character. He was buried in St Mary Undercroft, the crypt of St Stephen's Chapel, where his body was found in 1852, wrapped in a ceremonial cloth and allegedly "almost without signs of corruption".

The Provinciale
Lyndwood, however, is chiefly remembered for his great commentary upon the ecclesiastical decrees enacted in English provincial councils under the presidency of the Archbishops of Canterbury. This elaborate work, commonly known as the Provinciale, follows the arrangement of the titles of the Decretals of Gregory IX in the Corpus Juris, and copies of much of the medieval English legislation enacted, in view of special needs and local conditions, to supplement the jus commune. Lyndwood's gloss gives an account of the views accepted among the English clergy of his day upon all sorts of subjects.  It should be read together with John of Acton's gloss, composed circa 1333–1335, on the Legatine Constitutions of the thirteenth century papal legates, Cardinals Otto and Ottobuono for England, which was published with the Provinciale by Wynkyn de Worde.

The Provinciale was published as Constituciones prouinciales ecclesie anglica[n]e by Wynkyn de Worde in London in 1496).  The work was frequently reprinted in the early years of the sixteenth century, but the edition produced at Oxford in 1679 is sometimes seen as the best.

The Catholic Encyclopaedia saw the work as important in the controversy over the attitude of the Ecclesia Anglicana towards the jurisdiction of the pope. Frederic William Maitland controversially appealed to Lyndwood's authority against the view that the "Canon Law of Rome, though always regarded as of great authority in England, was not held to be binding on the English ecclesiastical courts". The Catholic Encyclopaedia also contends that Maitland's arguments had found broader acceptance in English law:

However, Maitland's view of Lyndwood's authority was attacked by Ogle.

Notes

Bibliography

Helmholz, R. H. (2006) "Lyndwood, William (c.1375–1446)", Oxford Dictionary of National Biography, Oxford University Press, online edn, accessed 8 Sept 2007 

 

Powicke, F. Maurice and E. B. Fryde Handbook of British Chronology 2nd. ed. London:Royal Historical Society 1961
Reeves, A. C. (1989) "The careers of William Lyndwood", in J. S. Hamilton and P. J. Bradley (eds) Documenting the Past: Essays in Medieval History Presented to George Peddy Cuttino, pp197–216, Woodbridge: Boydell Press, 
Thurston, H. (1913) "William Lyndwood", Catholic Encyclopaedia Lyndwood's Provinciale: The Text of the Canons Therein Contained, Reprinted from the Translation Made in 1534'', ed. J. V. Bullard and H. Chalmer Bell (London: Faith Press, 1929).

14th-century births
1446 deaths
Bishops of St Davids
Archdeacons of Stow
Canon law jurists
Medieval English diplomats
15th-century English Roman Catholic bishops
Lords Privy Seal
Alumni of Gonville and Caius College, Cambridge
Fellows of Pembroke College, Cambridge
15th-century English writers
15th-century diplomats